Nagayalanka mandal is one of the 25 mandals in Krishna district of the Indian state of Andhra Pradesh. It is under the administration of Machilipatnam revenue division and has its headquarters at Nagayalanka. The mandal is bounded by Avanigadda and Koduru mandals. It lies at the mouths of Krishna River where it empties into Bay of Bengal.

Demographics 

 census, the mandal had a population of 47,899. The total  
population constitute, 25,076 males and 22,823 females —a sex ratio of 910 females per 1000  
males. 4,420 children are in the age group of 0–6 years, of which 2,483 are boys and 1,937 are girls. The average literacy rate stands at 68.99% with 29,995 literates.

Towns and villages 

 census, the mandal has 11 villages and no towns. Nagayalanka is the most populated village and Chodavaram is the least populated villages in the mandal.

The settlements in the mandal are listed below:

See also 
Mandals in Nagayalanka mandal

References 

Mandals in Krishna district